Locust Grove is a historic home located at Purcellville, Loudoun County, Virginia.  The house was built in two phases, one before 1817 and another in 1837.  The original section is a single-pile, two-story structure built of fieldstone with a side gable roof in the Federal style.  Attached to it is the later -story, three-bay, double-pile, fieldstone addition.  The interior features Federal and Greek Revival style decorative details. Also on the property are the contributing stone spring house, a frame barn, a garage, a stone watering trough, and a stone chimney.

It was listed on the National Register of Historic Places in 2007.

References

Houses on the National Register of Historic Places in Virginia
Federal architecture in Virginia
Greek Revival houses in Virginia
Houses completed in 1837
Houses in Loudoun County, Virginia
National Register of Historic Places in Loudoun County, Virginia
Purcellville, Virginia